"Something in Your Eyes" is a song written by Thomas G:son, Henrik Sethsson and Erik Bernholm. Performed by Jenny Silver in the first semifinal of Melodifestivalen 2011 in Luleå, the song made it to Andra Chansen, where it was knocked out of the contest.

The song also stayed at the top 10 chart Svensktoppen for three weeks before leaving the chart.

Chart positions

Steps version

British group Steps recorded a cover of "Something in Your Eyes" for their sixth studio album, What the Future Holds (2020). It was released as the album's second single on 27 October 2020.

Background and promotion
The single premiered on BBC Radio 2. Steps described the track as "so much fun", adding that it was "a nod to old Steps... You can't help but sing along and feel uplifted by it."

Music video
The official music video for "Something in Your Eyes" premiered online on 28 October 2020. It was directed by Carly Cussen.

Track listing
Remixes
"Something in your Eyes" - 3:01
"Something in your Eyes" (7th Heaven Remix) [Edit]- 3:01
"Something in your Eyes" (GMJS Poptastic Radio Edit) - 3:42
"Something in your Eyes" (Acoustic) - 3:06
"Something in your Eyes" (7th Heaven Remix) – 5:53
"Something in your Eyes" (GMJS Poptastic Club Anthem) - 7:10

Reception
"Something in Your Eyes" was added to the "B List" on BBC Radio 2's New Music Playlist for the week commencing 7 November 2020. It was also made record of the week on Tring Radio.

Personnel
Lead vocals – Faye Tozer, Claire Richards, Lisa Scott-Lee
Background vocals – Lee Latchford Evans, Ian "H" Watkins

Charts

References

2011 singles
2020 singles
Jenny Silver songs
Melodifestivalen songs of 2011
2011 songs
Songs written by Thomas G:son
Songs written by Erik Bernholm
2020 songs
Steps (group) songs